Bridge between East Manchester and Newberry Townships is a historic Pennsylvania (Petit) truss bridge spanning Conewago Creek East Manchester Township and Newberry Township, York County, Pennsylvania. The bridge was built in 1889 by the Wrought Iron Bridge Company and measures  in overall length. The bridge was taken out of service about 1985, and is located alongside the new bridge.

It was added to the National Register of Historic Places in 1988.

References

Road bridges on the National Register of Historic Places in Pennsylvania
Bridges completed in 1889
Bridges in York County, Pennsylvania
National Register of Historic Places in York County, Pennsylvania
Wrought iron bridges in the United States